Rackman may refer to:

People 
 Emanuel Rackman, American rabbi
 Steve Rackman, Australian actor and professional wrestler

Other 
 The Rackman Center, research institution, think tank, and legal aid clinic

See also 
 Peter Rachman, Polish-born landlord
 Arthur Rackham, English illustrator